Marksovsky District is an administrative and municipal district (raion), one of the thirty-eight in Saratov Oblast, Russia. It is located in the center of the oblast. Its administrative center is the town of Marks (which is not administratively a part of the district). Population: 33,719 (2010 Census);

Administrative and municipal status
Within the framework of administrative divisions, Marksovsky District is one of the thirty-eight in the oblast. The town of Marks serves as its administrative center, despite being incorporated separately as a town under oblast jurisdiction—an administrative unit with the status equal to that of the districts.

As a municipal division, the district is incorporated as Marksovsky Municipal District, with Marks Town Under Oblast Jurisdiction being incorporated within it as Marks Urban Settlement.

References

Notes

Sources

Districts of Saratov Oblast

